The Delhi State Industrial and Infrastructure Development Corporation (DSIIDC), established in 1971, reports directly to the Delhi Government and is responsible for major development projects in the city. 

Over the recent history DSIIDC has been given single charge of development of regions in the city which has improved services by clearing the previous multiplicity of departments.

References

Construction and civil engineering companies established in 1971
Indian companies established in 1971
State industrial development corporations of India
1971 establishments in Delhi
Government agencies established in 1971